The Río Grande de Arecibo (Arecibo River) is a river of Puerto Rico. The headwaters lie in the mountains to the south of Adjuntas. From there it flows north until it reaches the Atlantic Ocean near Arecibo. The tributaries lie along the side of the Cerro de Punta and the Utuado pluton. It flows through the northern, passing along a gorge that is 200 m deep and 800–1,200 m wide. It flows through the middle of Puerto Rico.

The tributaries to Río Grande de Arecibo basin are Vacas, Pellejas, Garzas, Saltillo, Cidra, Grande de Jayuya, Caguana, Caonillas, Yunés, Limón, Jauca, Tanamá and Santiago rivers.

Flood control project
In mid 2018, the United States Army Corps of Engineers announced it would be undertaking a major flood control project of the river, with a budget of $82.9 million.

In mid 2021, funding was appropriated for work on the Río Grande de Arecibo, including work to improve the natural habitat of local species, including the Puerto Rican crested toad and a Río Grande de Arecibo canalization project was set to begin in 2023.

Gallery

See also
 Cambalache Bridge: NRHP listing in Arecibo, Puerto Rico
 List of rivers of Puerto Rico

References

External links

 USGS Hydrologic Unit Map – Caribbean Region (1974)
 Ríos de Puerto Rico 

Rivers of Puerto Rico